Prestwick Town railway station is a railway station serving the town of Prestwick, South Ayrshire, Scotland. The station is managed by ScotRail and is on the Ayrshire Coast Line.  Originally known only as Prestwick, it was one of the original stations on the Ayr to Irvine portion of the Glasgow, Paisley, Kilmarnock and Ayr Railway opened in August 1839.

Prestwick Town is one of the few stations on the Ayrshire Coast Line that remains staffed (the ticket office being staffed part-time, seven days per week - Monday - Saturday 06:35 - 17:50, Sunday 09:10 - 16:50). Facilities include a medium-sized car park and a café is present in the station building itself.

The ticket office at Prestwick Town has recently been refurbished, and now includes a height-adjustable ticket desk and automatic doors. Smartcard validators have been installed at the entrances to both platforms.  Step-free access is only available on platform 2, as the opposite platform is only reachable via a stepped footbridge or steep ramp from the nearby road.

Services
Of these, two serve all stations to  en route, whilst the others run fast north of Kilwinning. Certain  - Ayr -  services also stop here. On Sundays, there is a half-hourly service each way to Glasgow and Ayr.

References

Railway stations in South Ayrshire
Former Glasgow and South Western Railway stations
Railway stations in Great Britain opened in 1839
Railway stations in Great Britain closed in 1839
Railway stations in Great Britain opened in 1841
Railway stations in Great Britain closed in 1841
Railway stations in Great Britain opened in 1846
SPT railway stations
Railway stations served by ScotRail
1839 establishments in Scotland
Prestwick